Leonnatus (356 BC – 322 BC) was a Macedonian officer of Alexander the Great and one of the diadochi.

He was a member of the royal house of Lyncestis, a small Greek kingdom that had been included in Macedonia by King Philip II of Macedon. Leonnatus was the same age as Alexander and was very close to him. Later, he was one of Alexander's seven bodyguards, or somatophylakes. After Alexander died in 323 BC, the regent, Perdiccas, made Leonnatus satrap of Hellespontine Phrygia.

Diodorus (Book XVII.37-38) tells us that during the Battle of Issus, the immediate family of Darius had been captured by the Macedonian Army. Darius' family was hysterical that they would suffer a dreadful fate.  However, Leonnatus was able to explain to them, on behalf of Alexander, that this would not be the case.  In fact, Alexander promised to respect them as royalty, increase their household servants and to raise Darius' 6-year-old boy as his own.

He crashed the rebellion of Oritians in India, while losing only a few men.

Alexander's sister Cleopatra, the widow of King Alexander I of Epirus, offered her hand to Leonnatus. When the Athenians heard that Alexander had died, they revolted against Macedonia and the new regent, Antipater. Leonnatus led an army of 20,000 infantry with 1,500 cavalry to relieve Antipater during the siege in Lamia (see Lamian War). He intervened probably with the ambition to usurp Antipater's power. A victory in battle against the Athenians would have certainly enhanced his claim to the throne. Leonnatus was killed in battle against the Athenians and his marriage with Cleopatra never took place.

Notes

External links
Leonnatus at Livius.com

356 BC births
322 BC deaths
4th-century BC Greek people
Somatophylakes
Ancient Macedonian generals
Generals of Alexander the Great
Satraps of the Alexandrian Empire
Ancient Macedonians killed in battle
Ancient Lyncestians
Trierarchs of Nearchus' fleet
4th-century BC Macedonians
Hellespontine Phrygia